Joseph Phillips (22 April 1840 – 7 May 1901) was an Australian cricketer. He played six first-class cricket matches for Victoria between 1865 and 1871.

See also
 List of Victoria first-class cricketers

References

1840 births
1901 deaths
Australian cricketers
Victoria cricketers
People from Parramatta
Cricketers from Sydney
Melbourne Cricket Club cricketers